J. Lewis "Papa" Hall, Jr. (April 2, 1931 – September 15, 2010) was a college football player and track athlete; later an attorney and circuit court judge. Hall was a prominent running back for the Florida Gators of the University of Florida,  “recruited by every major Southern college.” Papa Hall and fellow backs Buford Long and Rick Casares were part of the Gators' winning backfield during the team's 8–3 season in 1952. Hall was its leading rusher. Hall was also an NCAA national champion high jumper in track and field. After college, he decided against a professional football career. Hall ran for ninety-four yards in the team's 14–13 Gator Bowl victory on New Year's Day 1953.

See also
 List of University of Florida Athletic Hall of Fame members

References

External links

1931 births
2010 deaths
Florida Gators football players
American football halfbacks